Hendrik Wouda (Leeuwarden 10 May 1885 – Wassenaar 25 October 1946.) Dutch architect and furniture designer. He designed furniture, lighting and interiors for homes, offices, ships and exhibitions. His work is characterized by a strongly marked simplicity, a cubic joining together of volumes, well-balanced spatial effects and a practical division of the floor-plan. He also practiced independently as an architect.

In his designs, such as that for the Villa De Luifel (1924) in Wassenaar and the Villa Kessler or Slingerduin (1929) in Velsen, Wouda showed himself to be influenced by Frank Lloyd Wright. The interior of the Villa Kessler reflects a monumental, subdued atmosphere in its use of color.

After being educated in Rotterdam and The Hague and briefly working in Amsterdam, Wouda went on tour in Germany and Austria in 1912. In Munich, he was influenced by Eduard Pfeiffer, before returning to the Netherlands when World War I broke out.

In 1916, Wouda established himself as an architect in The Hague and one year later he was employed at the furniture firm of H. Pander & Zonen. He received the freedom to develop his own monumental style, clearly inspired by Wright but also influenced by his sojourn in Germany. In 1918-1919 he worked with Jan Wils (Alkmaar). His first well-known commission was for the interiors of the Villa Sevensteyn (1920–21) built by W.M. Dudok in Zorgvliet Park, The Hague. 
The graphic geometric character that characterizes his entire oeuvre is demonstrated strongly in his typographic design, such as the lettering of his own villa “The Appelhof” in Wassenaar (1930).

Sources

References

External links

  Recent auction of Wouda furniture
  Photograph of Villa De Luifel
  Photographs of Villa Kessler (Slingerduin) (in Dutch)
 Location and information on Villa Kessler (Slingerduin) (in Dutch), via Dutch Architectural Institute 

1885 births
1946 deaths
20th-century Dutch architects
People from Leeuwarden
20th-century Dutch businesspeople
Dutch furniture designers